The Hawker Cygnet was a British ultralight sesquiplane aircraft of the 1920s.

Background
In 1924, the Royal Aero Club organized a Light Aircraft Competition. £3000 was offered in prizes. An entry was made by Hawker Aircraft, which was a design by Sydney Camm, the Cygnet. Camm had joined Hawker the previous year. Two aircraft were built (G-EBMB and G-EBJH) and were entered in the competition, held in 1924 at Lympne Aerodrome, by T. O. M. Sopwith and Fred Sigrist. The aircraft were flown by Longton and Raynham and came in 4th and 3rd places respectively. In 1925, G-EBMB was entered again in the 100 mi (161 km) International Handicap Race, this time flown by George Bulman, who won at a speed of 75.6 mph (121.7 km/h). At the same meeting, the Cygnet came in 2nd in the 50 mi (80 km) Light Aeroplane Race. In 1926, both aircraft were entered in the competition piloted by Bulman and Flying Officer Ragg, taking first and second place respectively.

Design
The aircraft were of wood-and-fabric construction, the fuselage being four longerons-strutted in the fashion of a Warren girder. The wing had two box spars with Warren truss ribs. Initially the two aircraft were powered, one by an Anzani, and the other by an ABC Scorpion (both opposed twin-cylinder engines). In 1926 the engines in both Cygnets were changed to the Bristol Cherub III, another twin-cylinder engine. The airframe weighed a remarkably low 270 lb, and its weight when empty was only 373 lb.

Postwar history

G-EBMB was kept by Hawker in storage until 1946, when it was refurbished and reassembled at Hawker's Langley Aerodrome. It was later transferred to their new facility at Dunsfold, where it stayed, being flown to various displays and airshows, until 1972, when it was transferred for exhibition at the Royal Air Force Museum at Hendon. More recently it has been transferred to its site at RAF Cosford in Shropshire, where it can now be seen.  An airworthy replica is on display at the Shuttleworth Collection, Old Warden, Bedfordshire.

Specifications

See also

References

Notes

Bibliography

Mason, Francis K. Hawker Aircraft since 1920. London:Putnam, 1991..

External links

Hawker Cygnet – British Aircraft Directory

1920s British civil utility aircraft
Cygnet
Single-engined tractor aircraft
Sesquiplanes
Aircraft first flown in 1924